Fill factor may refer to:

Fill factor (solar cell), the ratio of maximum obtainable power to the product of the open-circuit voltage and short-circuit current
Fill factor (image sensor), the ratio of light-sensitive area of a pixel to total pixel area in an image sensor
In vision science, the ratio of view areas to the object visible areas.
In computer science, the proportion of space to use in a database index, the rest being reserved for future growth